Gumnaam, sometimes spelled Gumnam, is a 1954 Pakistani Urdu language crime blockbuster film directed and screenplay by Anwar Kamal Pasha, produced by Agha G. A. Gul and written by Hakim Ahmad Shuja. Music composed by Inayat Hussain, it stars Sabiha Khanum, Sudhir, Himalyawala, Seema and Ragni in the lead. In 2018, Lok Virsa Museum displayed the film as part of special showcase of the feature films in the country. The film is primarily known for its music and lyrics, and is recognized one of the music blockbuster films of the Pakistani cinema of the 1950s.

It talks about sexual desire and crime, involving a village girl and a boy who is intentionally trapped by a club owner in a case, leading his fiancée to wait for months to reply to the love letters she sends the boy.

Plot 
Sudhir is a criminal who left the village to escape police arrest. After evacuation, the two lost contact, and they keep writing letters to each other as a result. His fiancee has never been to school, and she always seeks help from each other to read letters. Due to the absence of her fiancé, she suffers from a memory disorder such as trauma. One day, her fiance is arrested by law enforcement agencies, but before he went to jail, he writes a letter to her fiance explaining the situation. When she opens the letter, a man approaches her and fakes Sudhir's death in an attempt to marry her.

Cast 
 Sabiha Khanum
 Sudhir
 Ragni

Soundtrack

References

External links 
 

1954 films
1950s Urdu-language films
1950s musical drama films
Pakistani musical films
Pakistani crime films
Films set in Karachi
Films shot in Pakistan
Pakistani black-and-white films